Refuge d'Ambin is a refuge in the Alps in France.

Mountain huts in the Alps
Mountain huts in France